Papilio buddha, the Malabar banded peacock, is a species of swallowtail butterfly found in the Western Ghats of India.
The Government of Kerala declared it as the official Kerala state butterfly.

Description

P. buddha resembles P. palinurus but is larger. The upperside of the wings also differ with the irroration of green scales more restricted, the outer half of the forewing except a triangular patch from the apex of wing downwards, and the outer third of the hindwing except a subterminal series of ill-formed lunules, devoid of green scales; discal transverse bands on both forewing and hindwings similar to those in P. palinurus but very much broader; the discal band of the forewing measured on the dorsum occupies considerably more than one-third of the dorsal length, while the discal band of the hindwing is as broad posteriorly as it is anteriorly (in P. palinurus it is much narrower posteriorly); the ochraceous tornal ocellus brighter, not surmounted with blue; the subapical ochraceous lunule in interspace 7 also brighter and much larger.

The underside is similar to the underside of P. palinurus, but on the hindwing the ochraceous lunules in the subterminal series is proportionately narrower and much more conspicuously bordered on their innersides with silvery white. Antennae, head, thorax and abdomen as in P. palinurus.

The wingspan is 107–155 mm.

Life history
The caterpillar has a shield on the thoracic segments. Green, the shield laterally and posteriorly narrowly edged with white; segments 5 to 11 with a broad white line and above it a series of minute white spots on each segment.

The pupa is curved ventrally, head cleft, the processes long and upturned, back and sides keeled; colour dark green ventrally, pale green dorsally (after Davidson and Aitken).

Host plants
The larva (caterpillar) has been recorded on Zanthoxylum rhetsa.

Status
This species is locally common and not rare. It is protected in India but not known to be threatened.

See also
 Papilionidae
 List of butterflies of India (Papilionidae)

Cited references

References

 Erich Bauer and Thomas Frankenbach, 1998 Schmetterlinge der Erde, Butterflies of the world Part I (1), Papilionidae Papilionidae I: Papilio, Subgenus Achillides, Bhutanitis, Teinopalpus. Edited by Erich Bauer and Thomas Frankenbach.  Keltern: Goecke & Evers; Canterbury: Hillside Books  
 
 
 
 
 
 

buddha
Butterflies of Asia
Endemic fauna of the Western Ghats
Butterflies described in 1872